François Bellugou (born 25 April 1987) is a French professional footballer who most recently played for AJ Auxerre as a midfielder.

Honours
Guingamp
 Coupe de France: 2009

External links
 

1987 births
Living people
Sportspeople from Pyrénées-Orientales
Association football midfielders
French footballers
Ligue 1 players
Ligue 2 players
Championnat National players
Championnat National 3 players
Montpellier HSC players
FC Sète 34 players
En Avant Guingamp players
AS Nancy Lorraine players
FC Lorient players
ES Troyes AC players
AJ Auxerre players